Johnstown is a townland in County Westmeath, Ireland.

Johnstown is one of 12 townlands of the civil parish of Templeoran in the barony of Moygoish in the Province of Leinster.

The neighbouring townlands are: Ballyedward to the north, Wattstown to the north–east, Monroe to the north–east, Monroe or Johnstown (Nugent) to the east, Scurlockstown and Lugnagullagh to the south–east, Slane Beg to the south, Sonna Demesne to the west and Piercefield or Templeoran to the north–east.

In the 1911 census of Ireland there were 18 houses and 74 inhabitants in the townland.

References

External links
Johnstown at openstreetmap.org
Johnstown at the IreAtlas Townland Data Base
Johnstown at Townlands.ie
Johnstown at The Placenames Database of Ireland

Townlands of County Westmeath